Nuptse or Nubtse (Sherpa:  नुबचे, Wylie: Nub rtse) is a mountain in the Khumbu region of the Mahalangur Himal, in the Nepalese Himalayas. It lies two kilometres WSW of Mount Everest. Nubtse is Tibetan for "west peak", as it is the western segment of the Lhotse-Nubtse massif.

The main peak, Nubtse I, was first climbed on May 16, 1961 by Dennis Davis and Sherpa Tashi and the following day by Chris Bonington, Les Brown, James Swallow and Pemba Sherpa, members of a British expedition led by Joe Walmsley. After a long hiatus, Nubtse again became the objective of high-standard mountaineers in the 1990s and 2000s, with important routes being put up on its west, south, and north faces.

While Nubtse is a dramatic peak when viewed from the south or west, and it towers above the base camp for the standard south col route on Everest, it is not a particularly independent peak: its topographic prominence is only . Hence it is not ranked on the list of highest mountains.

Views

References

External links
 Nuptse on Summitpost
 Nuptse on Peakware - photos
 Günther Seifferth, Nuptse at himalaya-info.org.

Mountains of Nepal
Seven-thousanders